James R. Rettig (November 11, 1950 – August 17, 2022) was an American librarian and educator. He served as dean of libraries at the United States Naval Academy and as president of the American Library Association, the largest and oldest library association in the world.

Life and career 
Rettig graduated with bachelor's and master's degrees in English from Marquette University and a master's in library science from the University of Wisconsin-Madison in 1975. He worked in leadership and public service at the College of William and Mary, the University of Illinois at Chicago, the University of Dayton and Murray State University. Rettig served as the university librarian at the University of Richmond from 1998 to 2012. He subsequently served as dean of libraries at the United States Naval Academy until his retirement in 2017.

Rettig served as president of the American Library Association from 2008 to 2009. He also served as president of the Reference and User Services Association, served on the ALA Executive Board and the ALA Council, and chaired the ALA Committee on Organization and the ALA Publishing Committee.

Awards and honors
 Distinguished Alumnus Award from the University of Wisconsin-Madison School of Library and Information Studies
 G.K. Hall Award for Library Literature
 Mudge Citation and Shores-Oryx Press Award from the Reference and User Services Association
 Online magazine's author award

References

 
 

1950 births
2022 deaths
Marquette University alumni
University of Wisconsin–Madison School of Library and Information Studies alumni
Presidents of the American Library Association
American librarians

Academic librarians
United States Naval Academy faculty